Top loader or toploader may refer to:

 Toploader, an English alternative rock band from Eastbourne formed in 1997
 Top Loader, a 1993 album by Sugarsmack
 Ford Toploader transmission, a manually shifted three and four speed gearbox introduced in 1964 by the Ford Motor Company

The term top loader may also be used to distinguish versions of machines with the loading mechanism at the top from other configurations (e.g. front-loading):-
 Nintendo Entertainment System (Model NES-101) (also known as the Top loader), a redesign of the NES game console named for its modified cartridge mechanism
 Videocassette recorders with the cassette-loading mechanism on the top surface
 Top-loading washing machine, a washing machine design

See also 
 Loader (equipment)